The 2019–20 season is Ittihad Riadi Tanger's 37th season in existence and the club's 21st in the top flight of Moroccan football, and fifth consecutive.

Kit
Supplier: Gloria Sport / Club Sponsor: front: Renault (the only sponsor in the ACCC), Moroccan Airports Authority, APM Terminals, Tanger-Med ; back:  ; sleeves: STG Telecom ; short: RCI Finance Maroc

Season review

June

On 26 June, the club announced Nabil Neghiz would be the new IRT coach.

July

On 8 July, Ittihad Tanger announced they had reached an agreement with AS Athlétic d'Adjamé for the transfer of Mustafa Camara.

Players

Squad
.

From youth squad

Out during the season

Transfers

Players in

Players out

Technical staff 

until 26 October 2019.

until 19 November 2019.

until 26 January 2020.

from 6 August 2020.

Statistics

Squad appearances and goals
Last updated on 10 October 2020.

|-
! colspan=14 style=background:#dcdcdc; text-align:center|Goalkeepers

|-
! colspan=14 style=background:#dcdcdc; text-align:center|Defenders

|-
! colspan=14 style=background:#dcdcdc; text-align:center|Midfielders

|-
! colspan=14 style=background:#dcdcdc; text-align:center|Forwards

|-
! colspan=14 style=background:#dcdcdc; text-align:center| Players who have made an appearance or had a squad number this season but have left the club
|-

|-
|}

Goalscorers

Assists

Clean sheets
Last updated on 10 October 2020.

Disciplinary record

Pre-season and friendlies

Competitions

Overview

Botola

Standings

Results summary

Results by round

Matches

Results overview

Throne Cup

Arab Club Champions Cup

Preliminary round

Group A

See also
2015–16 IR Tanger season
2016–17 IR Tanger season 
2017–18 IR Tanger season
2018–19 IR Tanger season

References

External links

Ittihad Tanger
Moroccan football clubs 2019–20 season